Reig's grass mouse (Akodon reigi) is a South American rodent species found in Brazil and Uruguay.  It is named after Argentine biologist Osvaldo Reig (1929–1992).

References

Akodon
Rodents of South America
Mammals of Brazil
Mammals of Uruguay
Mammals described in 1998
Taxa named by Osvaldo Reig
Least concern biota of South America